Yun Yen is a Taiwanese scientist, focusing in cancer research and translational medicine, currently at Taipei Medical University and an Elected Fellow of the American Association for the Advancement of Science.

References

Year of birth missing (living people)
Living people
Fellows of the American Association for the Advancement of Science
Taiwanese scientists
Thomas Jefferson University alumni
21st-century Chinese scientists
Academic staff of Taipei Medical University